Edward "Booger" Smith is an American streetball player from Brooklyn, NY. He is best known for being featured in the 1997 documentary "Soul In The Hole" when he was 17 years old. Smith is also one of a few streetballers who have ever appeared on the cover of the magazine "Sports Illustrated". He is also known for participating in New York City's EBC basketball tournament. On the basketball court, Smith is known for his dribbling and passing abilities. What one well-known streetball player said of Smith:

Sizzle can see for like 12 days ahead. I've been around a long time, and he's by far the best point guard I've played with. You don't understand how fast he is. There's no doubt in my mind that he can play in the NBA. - Anthony Heyward, AKA "Half-Man, Half-Amazing"

References

External links
 https://web.archive.org/web/20070929223247/http://www.legendboogersmith.com/
 https://web.archive.org/web/20071004214914/http://www.msfbasketball.com/interviews_booger.php
 https://www.imdb.com/title/tt0122728/ Soul In The Hole IMDB.com page

Smith, Ed